The American Association Most Valuable Player Award (MVP) was an annual award given to the best player in Minor League Baseball's American Association based on their regular-season performance. Though the league was established in 1902, the award was not created until 1929. It continued to be issued through the 1962 season, after which the league disbanded. In 1969, both the league and the award were revived, and the honor continued to be given until the league disbanded for a second time after the 1997 season.

First basemen, with 18 winners, won the most among infielders and all positions, followed by third baseman (10), shortstops (7), and second basemen (3). Fifteen winners were outfielders. Seven pitchers and three catchers won the award.

Eight players who won the MVP Award also won the American Association Rookie of the Year Award in the same season: Jerry Witte (1946), Herb Score (1954), Jack Smith (1962), Barry Larkin (1986), Lance Johnson (1987), Juan González (1990), Eric Owens (1995), and Magglio Ordóñez (1997). From 1929 to 1962, pitchers were eligible to win the MVP Award as no award was designated for pitchers. In 1969, the American Association established a Most Valuable Pitcher Award. No player won both awards.

Eleven players from the Denver Zephyrs were selected for the MVP Award, more than any other team in the league, followed by the Indianapolis Indians (9); the Minneapolis Millers and Wichita Aeros (6); the Milwaukee Brewers and Omaha Royals (4); the Oklahoma City 89ers and St. Paul Saints (3); the Columbus Red Birds, Kansas City Blues, Louisville Colonels, and Toledo Mud Hens (2); and the Charleston Senators, Fort Worth Cats, Iowa Cubs, Louisville Redbirds, Nashville Sounds, Omaha Dodgers, Toledo Sox, Tulsa Oilers, and Wichita Braves (1).

Six players from the Chicago Cubs and Cincinnati Reds Major League Baseball (MLB) organizations each won the award, more than any others, followed by the Montreal Expos organization (5); the Milwaukee Braves, Kansas City Royals, St. Louis Cardinals, and Texas Rangers organizations (4); the Chicago White Sox, Detroit Tigers, Milwaukee Brewers, New York Giants, and New York Yankees organizations (3); the Boston Red Sox, Cleveland Indians, Pittsburgh Pirates, and St. Louis Browns organizations (2); and the Houston Astros and Los Angeles Dodgers organizations (1). Five award winners played for teams that were not affiliated with any MLB organization.

Winners

Wins by team

Wins by organization

References
Specific

General

MVP
American Association (1902–1997) MVP Award winners
Awards established in 1929
Awards disestablished in 1997